The 2010 French Athletics Championships was the 122nd edition of the national championship in outdoor track and field for France. It was held on 8–10 July at the Stade Georges Pompidou in Valence. A total of 38 events (divided evenly between the sexes) were contested over the three-day competition. Christophe Lemaitre broke the French record in the men's 100 metres and 200 metres with times of 9.97 seconds and 20.16 seconds, respectively.

Results

Men

Women

References

Results
 Results. Fédération française d'athlétisme 

French Athletics Championships
French Athletics Championships
French Athletics Championships
French Athletics Championships
Sport in Drôme